Nathan Winters (born in Thermopolis, Wyoming ) is an American politician and a Republican member of the Wyoming House of Representatives representing District 28 from January 8, 2013, until his successor, John Winter, was seated January 8, 2019. Winters is a 2003 graduate of West Coast Baptist College.

Elections
2012: When Republican Representative Lorraine Quarberg retired and left the District 28 seat open, Winters won the three-way August 21, 2012 Republican Primary with 1,403 votes (55.8%), and the November 6, 2012 General election with 3,288 votes (74.5%) against Democratic nominee Connie Skates.
2014: Winters ran unopposed during the 2014 Election cycle
2016: Winters ran unopposed during the primary and won the General Election by 75.2% of the vote against Democratic Party nominee Howard Samelson.
2018: Winters lost the primary election for Wyoming State Auditor to Kristi Racines.

References

External links
Official page at the Wyoming Legislature
 
 Biography at Ballotpedia
 Financial information (state office) at the National Institute for Money in State Politics

Year of birth missing (living people)
People from Thermopolis, Wyoming
Living people
Republican Party members of the Wyoming House of Representatives
21st-century American politicians